The Institution of Mining Engineers (IMinE) was a former British professional institution.

History
It began as the Federated Institution of Mining Engineers in 1889, comprising the Chesterfield and Midland Counties Institution of Engineers; Midland Institute of Mining, Civil and Mechanical Engineers; North of England Institute of Mining and Mechanical Engineers; South Staffordshire and East Worcestershire Institute of Mining Engineers and later the North Staffordshire Institute of Mining and Mechanical Engineers, the Mining Institute of Scotland and the Manchester Geological and Mining Society. It was given a Royal Charter in 1915. In the early 1980s it became affiliated with Group Four of the Engineering Council; there were fifty-one affiliated engineering organisations to the Engineering Council.

Mergers
It merged with the National Association of Colliery Managers, effective from 23 October 1968. In 1995 it merged with the Institution of Mining Electrical and Mining Mechanical Engineers. Soon after discussions about a merger with the Institution of Mining and Metallurgy, founded in 1892, took place, which it merged with in 2002.

Presidents
 1889-90 John Marley
 1890-92 Thomas William Embleton
c.1900 - Wallace Thorneycroft
 1923 John Brass

Structure
It was headquartered at Cleveland House on City Road in London.

Function
Fellows of the institution took the initials FIMinE.

Awards
It awarded the Medal of the Institution of Mining Engineers.

See also
 List of engineering societies
 North of England Institute of Mining and Mechanical Engineers

References

Further reading
Strong, G.R. A history of the Institution of Mining Engineers. 1989

External links
 Mining Institute of Scotland

British mining engineers
Defunct professional associations based in the United Kingdom
Engineering societies based in the United Kingdom
Mining engineering
Mining in the United Kingdom
Mining organizations
Organisations based in the City of London